Argyranthemum gracile, called the Tenerife white marguerite, is a species of flowering plant in the genus Argyranthemum, native to Tenerife in the Canary Islands. Its cultivar 'Chelsea Girl' has gained the Royal Horticultural Society's Award of Garden Merit.

References

Glebionidinae
Flora of Tenerife
Plants described in 1844